David Ford Bond (October 23, 1904 – August 15, 1962) was an American radio personality.

He was the announcer for several popular radio shows in the 1930s and 1940s, earning him a spot on the This Is Your Life television show.

For his work on radio, Bond has a star on the Hollywood Walk of Fame at 6706 Hollywood Blvd.

Early years
Ford Bond was born in Louisville, Kentucky on October 23, 1904.

Radio
Bond began working on radio at WHAS in Louisville, Kentucky, and joined NBC in 1928.

For 20 years in the 1930s and 1940s, he was the announcer for several radio soap operas and other shows, including the advertising voice for a sponsor's product called Bab-O. He was also a sports announcer for NBC radio in the 1930s, calling college football games as well as the 1934 Major League Baseball All-Star Game and 1934 World Series. He also served as radio consultant for Thomas E. Dewey during Dewey's 1948 campaign for president.

For almost 30 years, Bond was the spokesman for Cities Service petroleum company, "the longest sponsor-announcer association in the history of radio."

Later years
Bond retired from broadcasting in 1953 "to go into the building business in the Virgin Islands."

Personal life
Bond was married to Lois Bennett, a singer.

Death
Bond died at St. Croix, Virgin Islands on August 15, 1962.

Appearances
This is a partial list of Bond's appearances on radio and television.

Radio
The American Melody Hour: Christmas Program (1947) .... Announcer
Fun At Breakfast (1946) .... Announcer
Manhattan Merry-Go-Round (1937) .... Announcer
Kraft Music Hall (1934) .... Announcer
Easy Aces (1930) .... Announcer

Television
This Is Your Life (1954) .... Himself
Cities Service Band of America (1949) .... Announcer

References

External links

1904 births
1962 deaths
American radio sports announcers
College football announcers
Major League Baseball broadcasters
Radio and television announcers
Radio personalities from Louisville, Kentucky